Caracas Museum of Contemporary Art is a museum of modern art located in the Parque Central Complex in Caracas, Venezuela. It was founded on 30 August 1973 by the journalist and art patron Sofía Ímber, also its director from 1973 to her dismissal in the Chavist cultural revolution of 2001. It opened in 1974 and was the first museum in Venezuela to offer a specialist art library, a formal children's and adults' learning area, a special education department for the blind, and a multimedia arts centre.

Its collection has 5,000 pieces, including works by Pablo Picasso, Claude Monet, Vasili Kandinsky, Fernand Léger, Piet Mondrian, Andy Warhol and Francis Bacon. Its director's dismissal, the 2002 theft of Henri Matisse's Odalisque in Red Pantaloons and the Venezuelan Crisis have involved the museum in corruption and neglect as well as leading to criticisms of poor security, rapid changes of directors and the cancellations of catalogues and exhibitions. Entry is free for the permanent collections and temporary exhibitions.

External links

Modern art museums
1973 establishments in Venezuela
Art museums and galleries in Caracas
Art museums established in 1973